Jesper de Jong (born 31 May 2000) is a Dutch tennis player. He has a career high ATP singles ranking of world No. 160 achieved on 13 June 2022. He also has a career high doubles ranking of world No. 135 achieved on 23 May 2022. De Jong has won one singles and five ATP Challenger doubles titles.

Professional career

2021: Maiden single Challenger title, top 250 in singles, top 200 in doubles
In March, he won his first Challenger title at the 2021 Saint Petersburg Challenger II with Sem Verbeek.

He won his third doubles title at the 2021 Almaty Challenger with Vitaliy Sachko. As a result, he hit a career-high in doubles of No. 204 on 14 June 2021. A week later, De Jong won also his first singles Challenger at the 2021 Almaty Challenger II defeating Marcelo Tomás Barrios Vera which resulted in a career-high of No. 260 on 21 June 2021.

2022: Top 200 in singles, top 150 in doubles, ATP debut 
Following a semifinal showing at the Challenger in Traralgon, Australia in January, he made his debut in the top 200 on 14 February 2022.

He made his ATP main draw doubles debut after qualifying as a pair partnering Sem Verbeek at the 2022 ABN AMRO World Tennis Tournament in Rotterdam. As a result, he reached a career-high doubles ranking of World No. 157 on 14 February 2022.

He made his ATP singles debut at the 2022 Libéma Open as a wildcard. As a result, he reached the top 160 in the singles rankings on 13 June 2022.

ATP Challenger and ITF World Tennis Tour finals

Singles: 10 (5–5)

Doubles: 22 (13–9)

References

External links
 
 

2000 births
Living people
Dutch male tennis players
Sportspeople from Haarlem
Tennis players at the 2018 Summer Youth Olympics
21st-century Dutch people